The Rio Branco antbird (Cercomacra carbonaria) is a bird species in the family Thamnophilidae. It is found in Brazil (Roraima) and Guyana. Its natural habitats are subtropical or tropical moist lowland forests and subtropical or tropical moist shrubland. It is severely threatened by habitat loss.

The Rio Branco antbird was described by the English ornithologists Philip Sclater and Osbert Salvin in 1873 and given its current binomial name Cercomacra carbonaria.

It was listed as Near Threatened on the IUCN Red List in 2008. In 2012, it was assessed as Critically Endangered by BirdLife International, which says the species likely to go extinct in twenty years if deforestation continues at its current pace.

References

Cercomacra
Birds of the Amazon Basin
Birds of Brazil
Birds of the Guianas
Critically endangered animals
Critically endangered biota of South America
Rio Branco antbird
Rio Branco antbird
Rio Branco antbird
Taxonomy articles created by Polbot